Boutron is a surname. Notable people with the surname include:

Isabelle Boutron (born 1971), French epidemiologist
Pierre Boutron (born 1947), Portugal-born French actor and director